As the third largest and second most populous country in Latin America, Mexico has developed an extensive transportation network to meet the needs of the economy. As with communications, transportation in Mexico is regulated by the Secretariat of Communications and Transportation, (Secretaría de Comunicaciones y Transportes, SCT) a federal executive cabinet branch.

Roadways

The roadway network in Mexico is extensive and covers all areas of the country. Of these,  are multi-lane expressways:  are four-lane highways and the rest have six or more lanes.

The highway network in Mexico is classified by number of lanes and type of access. The great majority of the network is composed of undivided or divided two-lane highways, with or without shoulders, and are known simply as carreteras. Four or more-lane freeways or expressways, with restricted or unrestricted access, are known as autopistas.  Speed limits on two-lane highways can vary depending on terrain conditions. The speed limit on multi-lane freeways or expressways is on average 110 km/h (70 mph) for automobiles and 95 km/h (60 mph) for buses and trucks.

The expressways are for the most part toll roads or autopistas de cuota. Non-toll roads are referred to as carreteras libres (free-roads). Most toll expressways have emergency telephone booths, water wells, and emergency braking ramps at short intervals. The toll usually includes a "travelers' insurance" (seguro del viajero) for any accident occurring within the freeway. The toll expressways are on average among the most expensive in the world according to a comparative study realized in 2004 by the Chamber of Deputies. The most traveled freeways are those that link the three most populous cities in Mexico— Mexico City, Guadalajara, and Monterrey in the form of a triangle.

No federal freeway or expressway crosses a city; toll expressways are either turned into toll bypasses (libramientos), often used as toll or free ring roads (periféricos), or are turned into major arterial roads  even if they function as freeways with restricted access.

Mexican highways are assigned a one to three-digit number. North-south highways are assigned odd numbers whereas east-west highways are assigned even numbers. Toll expressways usually run parallel to a free road and so are assigned the same number with the letter "D" added. (For example, the undivided two-lane highway connecting Mexico City and Puebla is MX 150, and the six-lane toll expressway is MX 150D).

Mexico has had difficulty in building an integrated highway network because of the country's orography and landscape characteristics—most of the country is crossed by high-altitude ranges of mountains. Over the last two decades, Mexico has made impressive investments in order to improve its road infrastructure and connect main cities and towns across the country. In spite of its extension and recent development, the roadway network in Mexico is still inadequate to meet the current needs of the population and except for the toll roads, and they are often inadequately maintained.

An additional problem is that in the center of the country the roads run into Metropolitan Mexico City from regional centers, but there are few roads that run peripherically to connect the other regional centers without running through the congestion around the capital. The federal government, in partnership with the government of Mexico State and the Federal District, has tried to alleviate that problem by constructing a tolled Mexico City bypass highway, "Arco Norte," which was partially opened in 2009.

Railroads

Mexico privatized its freight rail service with the dissolution of the former Ferrocarriles Nacionales de México freight service in 1998.  There is a Mexico City Metro and a Monterrey Metro as well as light rail systems operating in Mexico City (Xochimilco Light Rail), and Guadalajara (Guadalajara light rail system).

The Secretariat of Communications and Transport of Mexico has proposed a high-speed rail link that would transport passengers from Mexico City to Guadalajara, Jalisco, with stops in the cities of Querétaro, Guanajuato, Leon and Irapuato; and a connected line running from the port city of Manzanillo to Aguascalientes. The train, which would travel at 300 km/h, allows passengers to travel from Mexico City to Guadalajara in just 2 hours (the same trip by road would last 7 hours).

Airports and air travel 

Mexico has an extensive network of modern airports all throughout the territory; flying domestically is considered efficient and safe. Airport infrastructure in Mexico is the most advanced in Latin America: all the cities with more than 500,000 inhabitants have an airport. There are 1834 airports in Mexico, the third-largest number of airports by country in the world. The seven largest airports—which absorb 90% of air travel—are (in order of air traffic): Mexico City International Airport, Cancún International Airport, Don Miguel Hidalgo y Costilla International Airport (Guadalajara), General Mariano Escobedo International Airport (Monterrey), General Abelardo L. Rodríguez International Airport (Tijuana), General Juan N. Álvarez International Airport (Acapulco), and Lic. Gustavo Díaz Ordaz International Airport (Puerto Vallarta). All airports are privately owned, with the exception of Mexico City International Airport. This airport remains the largest in Latin America and the 44th largest in the world transporting close to 26 million passengers a year.

There are more than 70 domestic airline companies in Mexico. The major player in the industry is Aeroméxico, owned by Grupo Financiero Banamex. Mexicana de Aviación, the oldest airline in Mexico, was the second player of the industry until it ceased operations on August, 2010. Other small airlines include Aeroméxico Connect (Aeromexico regional subsidiary), Click Mexicana (Mexicana's low cost subsidiary), Aviacsa, Volaris, Interjet, TAR Aerolineas, Aeromar, VivaAerobus, Magnicharters and Republicair.

The governments of the United States and Mexico recently approved an agreement of "open skies", which allows low-cost carriers to operate point-to-point (direct) routes between American and Mexican cities. This will decentralize air traffic in North America by bypassing major hubs and connecting smaller cities directly.

Seaports 

Mexico has 76 seaports and 10 river ports. The four major seaports concentrating around 60% of the merchandise traffic are Altamira and Veracruz in the Gulf of Mexico, and Manzanillo and Lázaro Cárdenas in the Pacific Ocean. These four seaports are followed in traffic by Acapulco, Puerto Vallarta, Guaymas, Tampico, Topolobampo, Mazatlán and Tuxpan

See also 
 Telecommunications in Mexico
 Transport in Mexico City
 Economy of Mexico

References

External links 

  Información de transporte en Mexico
  Secretaria de Comunicaciones y Transportes portal
 Information on Mexico Infrastructure Projects and related investments
 MEXLIST general repository of Mexican railway information
 Mexican Bus Company Websites (defuncional)
 Annual conference in on Mexico Infrastructure Projects including energy, transportation, logistics and water
 Directory of Mexican Bus Company categorized by City with updated timetables